Clark Township is one of eleven townships in Atchison County, Missouri, United States. As of the 2010 census, its population was 895.

Clark Township was established in 1845.

Geography
It contains five cemeteries: Beck, Corning, Mount Hope, Pleasant Ridge and Pleasant Ridge.

The streams of Cow Branch, Old Channel Nishnabotna River and Rock Creek run through this township.

Transportation
Clark Township contains one airport, Steele Airport.

References

 USGS Geographic Names Information System (GNIS)

External links
 US-Counties.com
 City-Data.com

Townships in Atchison County, Missouri
Townships in Missouri
1845 establishments in Missouri